Alexander Hector McMillan McLeod (born 1 January 1951 in Glasgow) is a Scottish former professional footballer who played as a striker for many league clubs in Scotland and England.

McLeod played for Renfrew Juniors, where he had been successfully turned from a midfielder into a striker by manager Tommy Barrie.  McLeod began his senior career with St Mirren in 1970. He scored four goals in one Scottish League Cup game for St Mirren against Rangers at Ibrox.

Southampton then signed McLeod, but he failed to settle in Hampshire and he returned to Scotland with Hibernian. MacLeod, who was a relatively prolific goalscorer in a defensive era, scored for Hibernian in the 1979 Scottish Cup Final second replay against Rangers.

References

Sources

External links 
 Ally McLeod, www.ihibs.co.uk
 

1951 births
Living people
Footballers from Glasgow
Scottish footballers
Association football forwards
English Football League players
Scottish Football League players
St Mirren F.C. players
Southampton F.C. players
Huddersfield Town A.F.C. players
Hibernian F.C. players
Stenhousemuir F.C. players
Hamilton Academical F.C. players
Queen of the South F.C. players
Scottish Football League representative players
Renfrew F.C. players
Scotland under-21 international footballers
Scottish Junior Football Association players